The Hennessys are one of Wales' foremost traditional folk music groups.

History
In 1966, Frank Hennessy and Dave Burns (born David Burns, 4 November 1946, in Cardiff), both from Cardiff's Irish community, won a talent competition organised by Cardiff City Council which persuaded them to take up music professionally shortly afterwards, adding Paul Powell (born in 1946, in Cardiff – died 2007) on banjo and vocals. Having achieved success in the Cardiff area, they decided to spend some time travelling around Ireland, to acquire a wider musical experience. It was at this time that they were persuaded to develop a greater Welsh identity, and they started to introduce traditional Welsh language songs into their repertoire, with great success, and their career took off.

They appeared regularly on television in Wales, appeared on stage throughout the country and recorded several albums. Many of their songs like "Farewell to the Rhondda" (about the decline of the mining industry in Wales and its social consequences), "Tiger Bay" (about emigration from Tiger Bay, the dockland district of Cardiff) and the capital's anthem "Cardiff Born" have become folk standards. Other hits include "The Grangetown Whale" and "Billy the Seal".

The current line-up still includes Hennessy (on guitar) and Burns (on guitar and mandolin), who have now been joined by fiddle player Iolo Jones (born 12 February 1955, in Plymouth, England).

Frank Hennessy has been hosting his own radio programmes on BBC Radio Wales since 1984.

Discography

Frank Hennessy
Thoughts & Memories – 1988

Dave Burns
Last Pit in the Rhondda – 1986

The Hennessys
Down The Road - The Road and the Miles – 1969
Caneuon Cynnar / The Early Songs – 1993
Cardiff After Dark – 1984
Homecoming

References

External links 
 Frank Hennessy at BBC Radio Wales
 The Hennessys Discography at TheBalladeers

Welsh folk musicians
Celtic music groups
Musical groups from Cardiff